Senator Frerichs may refer to:

Jason Frerichs (born 1984), South Dakota State Senate
Mike Frerichs (born 1973), Illinois State Senate